Curtis Warren Pitt (born 1 February 1977) is an Australian politician who has been a Labor Party member of the Legislative Assembly of Queensland since 2009, representing the district of Mulgrave. On 14 February 2015, he was sworn in as Treasurer of Queensland.

He was later elected Speaker of the Queensland Legislative Assembly on 13 February 2018, the first sitting day after the 2017 Queensland state election.

Early life

Pitt was born in Cairns in Far North Queensland and raised in Gordonvale. He attended Gordonvale Primary School, Gordonvale High School, and completed his secondary education at St Mary's College in Woree. He has a Bachelor of Arts in politics from James Cook University in Cairns.

His father, Warren Pitt, was the member for Mulgrave from 1989 to 1995, when he was defeated by the National Party's Naomi Wilson, and again from 1998 to 2009.

Career
Prior to announcing his intention to run for parliament, Pitt was head of the Queensland Government's Indigenous Jobs and Enterprises Taskforce. He had previously led the government's business and skilled migration program.

Bligh Government

Pitt was elected to the seat of Mulgrave, standing for the Labor Party, at the 2009 state election with a 48.51% primary vote and a two-candidate preferred vote (2CP) of 58.08. During his first term, Pitt was Deputy Government Whip (May 2010 – February 2011) and was appointed to the Bligh Ministry in the February 2011 reshuffle as Minister for Disabilities, Mental Health and Aboriginal and Torres Strait Islander Partnerships.

During his time in cabinet, he oversaw the launch of the Learning Earning Active Places (LEAP) strategy to close the gap for the nearly 80 per cent of Queenslanders who live in urban and regional areas who identify as Aboriginal or Torres Strait Islanders. In 2011 he also released 'Just Futures', the Queensland Government's Aboriginal and Torres Strait Islander justice strategy to reduce the over-representation of Indigenous people in the criminal justice system. During NAIDOC 2011, he launched the 'Deadly Stories' campaign.

As Minister for Disability Services, he released 'Absolutely Everybody' – Queensland's ground breaking 10-year disability strategy, as well as the Carer Action Plan 2011–14, which focuses on the varying needs of carers. He also introduced the Forensic Disability Act 2011 and the Forensic Disability Service which provides a therapeutic model of support for those people on forensic orders with a sole diagnosis of intellectual or cognitive impairment. He was also a member of the COAG Select-Council working with the Australian Government to lay the foundations for the National Disability Insurance Scheme (NDIS).

As Queensland's first Minister for Mental Health, he jointly launched the anti-stigma campaign 'Change Our Minds', followed soon after by the launch of a new mental health community services plan "Supporting Recovery 2011–2017". He also led the development of the first Mental Health Commission for Queensland – another major mental health reform which was later adopted in-part by the Newman LNP Government.

Opposition (2012–2015)

Pitt was re-elected at the 2012 state election, albeit with his primary vote down 14.51 percentage points and his two-party share reduced to 51.45%. Following the election, which resulted in a severely reduced caucus of seven members, Pitt was appointed Leader of Opposition Business and given the following shadow ministerial portfolios: Treasury and Trade; Energy and Water Supply; Main Roads; Aboriginal and Torres Strait Islander Partnerships, Sport and Recreation.

After two portfolio reshuffles following by-election wins by Yvette D'Ath (Redcliffe) and Anthony Lynham (Stafford), Pitt became Shadow Treasurer and Shadow Minister for Trade, Energy and Water Supply, and Aboriginal and Torres Strait Islander Partnerships. He retained the role of Leader of Opposition Business in the Parliament.

Palaszczuk Government

Following the Queensland state election on 31 January 2015, Pitt was sworn in as Treasurer in the Palaszczuk Ministry on 14 February 2015.

After the 2017 Queensland state election, Pitt was elected as the 39th Speaker of the Queensland Legislative Assembly.

Other
Pitt was an Auxiliary Firefighter with the Queensland Fire and Rescue Service. He is a member of Lions Clubs International and state Patron of Stillbirth and Neonatal Death Support Queensland.

References

1977 births
Living people
Members of the Queensland Legislative Assembly
Australian Labor Party members of the Parliament of Queensland
Labor Right politicians
James Cook University alumni
University of Queensland alumni
Auxiliary firefighters
21st-century Australian politicians